The 2023 World Athletics Continental Tour, also known as the 2023 Continental Tour, is the fourth season of the annual series of outdoor track and field meetings, organised by World Athletics. The Tour forms the second tier of international one-day meetings after the Diamond League.

The Continental Tour is divided into four levels – Gold, Silver, Bronze and Challenger – each of which have different levels of competition and different prize offerings.

Schedule

References

External links

2023
World Athletics Continental Tour
Continental Tour